Al-Yadudah, alternatively spelled al-Yaduda or al-Yadoudeh could refer to the following places:

Al-Yadudah, Jordan
Al-Yadudah, Syria